Pokegama Creek in Pine County with its headwaters in Kanabec County is a stream in the U.S. state of Minnesota.

Pokegama is a name derived from the Ojibwe language Bakegamaa meaning "the water which juts off from another water", which describes Pokegama Lake that the Creek flows into in relation to the Snake River.

See also
List of rivers of Minnesota

References

Rivers of Kanabec County, Minnesota
Rivers of Pine County, Minnesota
Rivers of Minnesota